Journey of the Dunadan is the debut studio album by American progressive rock band Glass Hammer, released on August 3, 1993. It is a concept album based on the story of Aragorn from J.R.R. Tolkien's novel The Lord of the Rings.

Steve Babb is credited under the name Stephen DeArqe on the album. Singer Michelle Young is featured on the album, but would only become a band member for their next release, Perelandra.

Track listing

Personnel
 Glass Hammer
 Fred Schendel – lead and backing vocals, organ, keyboards, acoustic guitar, recorder, drums
 Stephen DeArqe – lead and backing vocals, synthesizer, bass guitar, trurus pedal, medieval guitar, percussion

 Additional musicians
 Piper Kirk – lead and backing vocals
 Michelle Young – lead and backing vocals
 Basil Clouse – bass on "The Palantir" & "Return of the King"
 David Carter – electric guitar on "Morannon Gate"
 Rod Lambert – electric violin on "The Palantir"
 Tony Mac – rhythm programming on "Return of the King"

 Production
 Fred Schendel, Stephen DeArqe – production
 Rosana Azar – cover art

References

Glass Hammer albums
1993 debut albums
Music based on The Lord of the Rings
Concept albums